In New York City, a desk appearance ticket (DAT) is an order to appear in the New York City Criminal Court for an arraignment.

Details 
A person who receives a DAT has been arrested. The DAT is simply one of two alternative means by which a person who is arrested appears for arraignment, or first appearance. A person who receives a DAT is permitted to appear in court on their own on the date indicated on the DAT document.

A person who does not receive a DAT is processed through the arrest to arraignment system and is supposed to have their arraignment within 24 hours.  From the point that the case is arraigned, a DAT case is like any other criminal case.  DATs may be issued for violation, misdemeanors, and "E" felonies. If a person fails to return to court on the date indicated on the DAT, the Court will issue an arrest warrant.

The authority for a DAT is found in Criminal Procedure Law §150.10, which describes a DAT as "a written notice issued and subscribed by a police officer... directing a designated person to appear in a designated local criminal court at a designated future time in connection with his alleged commission of a designated offense." 

Beginning January 1, 2020, new rules imposed by the New York State Legislature as part of sweeping criminal justice reform in New York State have significantly changed Desk Appearance Ticket procedures.  Chief among those changes is that the vast majority of misdemeanor and now many felony charges require the use of Desk Appearance Tickets.  The decision to proceed by way of desk appearance ticket is no longer discretionary with the police in the vast majority of circumstances.  Exceptions to the mandatory desk appearance ticket requirement include sex offenses, offenses against family members, and offenses where license suspension or the issuance of orders of protection is possible.  

A universal summons (summons ticket) is another type of appearance ticket (authorized by CPL article 150) that directs a defendant to appear for arraignment at a future date, but it also serves as the accusatory instrument (unlike a complaint filed by a prosecutor, as with a DAT) and the defendant is not arrested.

See also 
 Judiciary of New York
 Law of New York

References 

New York (state) law
Law enforcement in New York City
New York City law